Anthony F. Corvino (born September 15, 1965) is a former American football guard and tackle who played one season in the National Football League (NFL) for the New York Jets and three in the Arena Football League (AFL) for the Detroit Drive, Washington Commandos, and Connecticut Coyotes. He played college football at Southern Connecticut State.

Early life and education
Corvino was born on September 15, 1965. He attended H. Frank Carey Junior-Senior High School in Franklin Square, New York, graduating in c. 1983. He committed to Southern Connecticut State University, attending the school for four years: from 1983 to 1986. He was named All-New England as a senior and also lettered in lacrosse.

Professional career
After graduating, Corvino was signed by the New York Jets as an undrafted free agent during the 1987 NFL strike. He was a replacement player, and appeared in two games as a substitute. He wore number 67, and played tackle and guard. He was released at the end of the strike.

In 1988, he played for the semi-professional Brooklyn Mariners. They played the Racine Raiders in the national semi-pro championship, losing 3–5.

Corvino returned to the professional ranks in 1989, playing for the Detroit Drive of the Arena Football League (AFL). He appeared in two games as they won the Arena championship game. With the Commandos, he appeared in just one game, making one sack.

He played in five total games with them, making 5.5 tackles.

Notes

References

1965 births
Living people
American football offensive guards
American football offensive tackles
Southern Connecticut State Owls football players
New York Jets players
National Football League replacement players
Detroit Drive players
Washington Commandos players
Connecticut Coyotes players